Malsori Island
(Ishulli i Malësorit in Albanian) is an island in the north of Albania, in the Bojana river.

Name 

In the Albanian language Malësor (Malsor in the north dialect) means Highlander, so Malësori island means "The Highlander Island."

Geography 

Malësori island is located in the Buna river, in the Dajç municipal unit, Shkodër County, and it has an area of around 40 hectares or 0.4 square km. that makes it the third biggest island in Albania. Around the island are some villages, the nearest of which is Darragjat, and is less than 5 kilometers from Skadar Lake.

Demography 
Malësori Island has no civil population, like other islands in Albania.

Islands of Albania
Geography of Shkodër County